The Amateur Wife is a 1920 American silent comedy-drama romance directed by Edward Dillon and written by Nalbro Bartley and Jane Murfin. The film stars Irene Castle, William P. Carleton, Arthur Rankin, S.J. Warrington, Alex Saskins and Augusta Anderson. The film was released on February 22, 1920, by Paramount Pictures.

The Amateur Wife is a lost film.

Plot
As described in a film magazine, Justine Spencer (Castle), daughter of the musical comedy queen Dodo Spencer (Anderson), arouses the interest of wealthy bachelor Cosmo Spotiswood (Carleton) on account of her odd appearance and unhappy life. When Dodo Spencer is killed by a jilted admirer, he marries the young woman in a spirit of pity, and when she asks him to show some love for her, he tells her the true state of affairs. While he is abroad for a year, she secures a maid to brighten up her appearance and immediately is transformed into a pretty woman with a score of admirers. When her husband returns, she rebuffs him. Finally, convinced that she has awakened his love, she consents to live with him.

Cast 
Irene Castle as Justine Spencer
William P. Carleton as Cosmo Spotiswood
Arthur Rankin as Billy Ferris
S. J. Warmington as Randolph Ferguson
Alex Saskins as Oliver Ferris (credited as A. Saskin)
Augusta Anderson as Dodo Spencer
Mrs. Charles Dewey as Loti
Ellen Olson as Sara

References

External links 

 
 
Film still at the New York Public Library
Film stills #1 and #2 at www.wisconsinhistory.org

1920 films
1920s English-language films
Silent American comedy-drama films
1920 comedy-drama films
Paramount Pictures films
Films directed by Edward Dillon
American black-and-white films
American silent feature films
Lost American films
Films with screenplays by Jane Murfin
1920 lost films
Lost comedy-drama films
1920s American films
Silent romance films
American romance films